Hyaenotherium is an extinct genus of hyena.

Resources

Prehistoric hyenas
Prehistoric carnivoran genera
Miocene feliforms
Prehistoric mammals of Europe